Rayla is a fictional character in the American–Canadian fantasy computer-animated web television series The Dragon Prince, which has been aired on Netflix since 2018. The character was created by the show's co-creators Aaron Ehasz and Justin Richmond, and is voiced by Paula Burrows.

Rayla is introduced as a prodigy, 15 year-old Moonshadow Elf assassin, and the apprentice and protégé of veteran Moonshadow elven assassin Runaan. Sent on a mission to avenge the Dragon King and Prince, she ends up siding with the human princes and half-brothers Callum and Ezran in order to deliver the Dragon Prince back to his mother after learning that the Dragon Prince’s egg was not destroyed. Over the course of the series, Rayla and Callum develop a romantic relationship that becomes strained due her two-year absence on his fifteenth birthday.

Storylines

Background
Rayla is born on the 31 of July to Lain and Tiadrin. However, her parents are later recruited into the Dragonguard, an elite force of elven warriors sworn to protect the egg of the Dragon Prince. As a result, she was taken in by the assassin Runaan and his husband Ethari. For years, Runaan trains Rayla to be an assassin like himself.

Four months before the start of the series, the Dragon King, Avizandum is slain by King Harrow and Lord Viren. Frightened by this, the Dragonguard abandon their duty, apparently including Rayla's parents. This allows Viren to supposedly destroy the egg of the Dragon Prince. Ashamed of her parents' alleged cowardice, Rayla joins a small group of assassin on a mission to avenge the Dragon King and prince by killing Harrow and his son Ezran.

Book 1: Moon (2018)
Soon after arriving in Harrow's kingdom, Katolis, Rayla's team is discovered by a scout. She is sent by Runaan to kill him, but although Rayla manages to corner the scout, she hesitates upon seeing his fear, allowing him to escape. Fearful of Runaan's reaction, Rayla deceives him by staining her swords with deathberry juice. Per Moonshadow elven custom, Rayla and her fellow assassin literally bind themselves to their mission by tying ribbons round their wrists. Her deception is later revealed and Runaan takes her off the mission. Determined to make up for her mistake, Rayla sneaks into the castle to kill Harrow and Ezran, but finds Callum instead. To protect his younger brother, Callum lies that he is Ezran, but his deception is soon revealed when Ezran shows up. The two princes lead Rayla to Viren's secret underground room, where he has hidden the egg of the Dragon Prince.

Rayla abandons her mission to kill Harrow and Ezran, deciding that since the Dragon Prince's egg survives, revenge is unnecessary. However, even when shown the egg, Runaan refuses to back down and Rayla engages her former mentor in a duel to protect the princes. The two seem evenly matched, but Runaan deserts the fight to focus on killing Harrow. Rayla, Callum, Ezran and Bait (Ezran's pet Glow Toad) flee the castle, resolving to take the Dragon Prince egg home together. As they escape, however, one of Rayla's ribbons falls off, symbolizing Harrow's demise, but Rayla doesn't tell the princes. Because Callum now has a Primal Stone (an orb containing magical energy), Rayla educates the prince on the six Primal Sources of nature. Callum asks Rayla to help retrieve a cube which has the Primal Sources' symbols on it, and Rayla agrees only reluctantly. However, while retrieving the mysterious item, Rayla is captured by the princes' elf-hating aunt, General Amaya. Callum, Ezran and Bait rescue Rayla, but are soon cornered by Amaya and her soldiers. Desperate, Callum lies that Rayla wants to kill him and Ezran, hurting the elf's feelings. Rayla pretends to hold Callum and Ezran hostage in order to escape. Rayla realizes that her remaining assassin ribbon is getting tighter and will continue to do so until her hand comes off. Whilst travelling on a boat, Rayla eventually admits that she is afraid of water, but overcomes her fear to save Bait from being eaten by a giant fish. Rayla then explains her reasons for being here.

The next day, Rayla is attacked by Corvus, a soldier sent by Amaya to track them, and defeats him. Later, while travelling up a mountain, an argument between Rayla and Callum about the former's trustworthiness, coupled with a burp from Bait, causes an avalanche. The trio end up on an unstable frozen lake, where Rayla reveals the true nature of her wrist ribbon, but before she can reveal the death of Harrow, Callum desperately shoves the Dragon egg into Rayla's hands, causing her to drop it due to her dying hand. Ezran rescues the egg, but the freezing water leaves it severely weakened. Later, the group travels into a human town, where Rayla disguises herself as a human and unsuccessfully attempts to cut off her wrist ribbon with a Sun Forge blade, a super-heated dagger made by Sunfire elves. The group then travel up a mountain called the "Cursed Caldera" to find a mysterious "miracle healer". During the trip, they work together to slay a giant leech. The supposed "healer" turns out to be a female Moonshadow elf mage named Lujanne, who specializes in illusions. By unleashing the storm inside his Primal Stone, Callum manages to hatch the egg of the Dragon Prince, who then bites off Rayla's wrist ribbon.

Book 2: Sky (2019)
Though delighted to have both working hands again, Rayla wishes to move on immediately, but the others do not. Rayla is later attacked by Viren's children, Soren and Claudia, but the fight is stopped by Callum. Rayla distrusts Soren and Claudia, and suspects the former of trying to kill Ezran, but Callum doesn't believe her because he hasn't known her as long as Soren and Claudia. Feeling guilty, Rayla decides to tell Callum about Harrow's death, but Claudia does so first. Rayla's secret damages her friendship with Callum, but they reconcile after the latter finds himself unable to tell Ezran. Still mistrustful of Soren and Claudia, Rayla arranges a trick to reveal their treachery, and she, the princes, Azymondias and Bait escape. Later, the group hires a blind ex-pirate, Captain Villads to take them across an ocean. During the trip, Rayla admits to Villads that she no longer believes that being an assassin is for her.

After finally making it to shore, Rayla and the group witness a dragon being shot down after burning a town. Wishing to break the cycle of revenge, Rayla goes to save the wounded dragon, and, aided by Callum using dark magic, helps her escape. Afterwards, Corvus arrives and reveals Harrow's death to Ezran, devastating him. Ezran goes off to grieve and Corvus soon goes after him, leaving Rayla, Zym and Bait to watch over Callum, who has gone into a coma as a result of using dark magic. As Callum's condition worsens, Rayla becomes increasingly distraught over the possibility of losing him. She is about to confess something to him, but is cut off when he wakes up. Callum reveals he can use sky magic again, thus becoming the first human to use primal magic on his own. Ezran leaves the group to take the throne of Katolis. Rayla, Callum and Zym continue their trek into Xadia, but soon find their path blocked by a massive dragon, which Rayla fearfully identifies as Sol Regem.

Book 3: Sun (2019)
Rayla reveals that Sol Regem is the former King of the Dragons, left a bitter and hostile shadow of himself after being blinded during the wars between humans and magical creatures. The trio attempt to sneak past the ancient dragon, but Zym's fearful whimpers expose their presence. Rayla reluctantly attempts to convince Sol Regem to let them pass, but the attempt fails when the dragon detects dark magic on Callum. The trio manage to outwit Sol Regem and finally make it into Xadia.

Rayla, Callum, and Zym travel through Xadia, and the two teenagers grow noticeably closer. However, when they reach Rayla's birthplace, the Silvergrove, Rayla is devastated to learn that she has been made a "ghost", a magically cursed outcast, for abandoning her mission of assassination. They manage to make contact with Ethari, Runaan's husband, who gives them animal mounts in order to reach Queen Zubeia, Zym's mother, more quickly. They soon encounter a rogue Skywing elf named Nyx, who offers to guide the trio through the dangerous Midnight Desert. While the group takes a rest in the oasis, Rayla's grief over her banishment boils over, causing Callum to comfort her by giving a number of compliments. Unfortunately, Rayla mistakes the compliments for advances and kisses Callum, who in his surprise, accidentally rejects Rayla, angering her. The pair then discover that Nyx has stolen Zym. Rayla and Callum pursue Nyx, retrieve Zym from her and Rayla saves the Skywing elf from Soulfang serpents; cobra-like snakes which drain people's souls. Callum compliments Rayla for her courage, calling her a hero, and soon is lost staring into her eyes and kisses her. He then realizes he has gone too far and tries to move away, but Rayla forces him to kiss which he surrenders to happily, beginning their relationship.

Rayla, Callum and Zym finally reach the Storm Spire, the mountain home of the Queen Zubeia, where they reunite with Ezran and Bait. When the group reaches the top, however, they discover Zubeia has gone comatose in her grief over losing her mate and her egg. When a repentant Soren arrives and warns them about Viren's invasion, Rayla decides to stay and protect the Dragon Queen as an act of redemption for her parents. Using moon magic, Callum learns that Rayla's parents actually stayed and fought until overpowered, and convinced Viren not to destroy Zym's egg, thus saving him. Joined by Amaya, Janai and the remnants of the Sunfire Elves' army, Rayla and her friends prepare to make their stand against Viren and his army of magically enhanced soldiers.

During the battle, Rayla stays in the Storm Spire to protect Zym. They are later attacked by Viren, who attempts to harvest Zym's power for himself. In an act of self-sacrifice, Rayla throws herself and Viren off the pinnacle. Callum leaps after them, developing the ability to fly and saving Rayla, while Viren falls to his death. As they fly back to the Storm Spire, Rayla and Callum finally confess their love for each other. Afterwards, Rayla, Callum and the others watch as Zubeia awakens and reunites with Zym.

Through the Moon (2020)
Approximately two weeks after the season three finale "The Final Battle", Rayla is now living in the human realm of Katolis with Callum and King Ezra. However, she is still troubled by the loss of her parents and Runaan, and doubts that Viren is dead, as his body was never found. The trio travel back to the Cursed Caldrea in order to perform a rebirth ritual for Lujanne's pet Moon Phoenix.
 
Rayla's dwelling on the fate of her parents, Runaan and Viren puts a strain on her relationship with Callum, who wishes to move on. However, Callum, remembering that the Moon Nexus can be used to enter a world between life and death, comes up with an idea to rebuild the Moon Henge to allow Rayla to enter it and find closure. Rayla agrees, albeit reluctantly after learning that the ritual involves swimming in water. With the help of a large and strong man named Allen, Lujanne's new boyfriend, they succeed in rebuilding the ruins and Rayla enters the portal. While inside, she encounters the spirits of her four fellow assassins, who attack Rayla for failing her mission. However, they allow her to proceed after they notice her missing binding and conclude that she has carried out her mission after all, despite Rayla's attempts to correct them. Eventually, Rayla discovers a large cocoon, which contains a sleeping Viren inside (unknown to her this is the cocoon of Aaravos's caterpillar familiar, which is apparently metamorphosing into a clone of Viren). The souls of fallen soldiers then attack Rayla and attempt to trap her in the spirit realm forever, but Callum manages to save her.

Rayla reluctantly concludes that her family is dead. Although Callum tries to comfort her, Rayla confesses that she saw Viren inside a cocoon, and concludes that this means he is alive and must be stopped. Not wanting her to go alone, Callum insists they search for him together and Rayla promises him they will, before the two confess their love for each other once more. Fearing for Callum's safety, however, Rayla remorsefully breaks her promise at nighttime and departs alone, having left Callum a heartfelt letter on his fifteenth birthday.

Book 4: Earth (2022)
Following her departure, Rayla spent the next two years in search of Viren, but failed to find any trace of him. During her search, Rayla found and adopted Stella, an orphaned Cuddlemonkey. Rayla returns to Katolis and reunites with the group, joining them on their new quest to find the keys to Aaravos's prison and prevent his release. However, Rayla and Callum's relationship is strained as Callum is still deeply hurt and angry about Rayla leaving him. Rayla regrets her actions and attempts to renew their romance and make amends, but with little success. While confronting Claudia in Rex Igneous' lair, she learns that her long-lost parents, Lain and Teradain, and legal guardian Runaan were cursed by Viren, and receives the coins, in which their spirits are imprisoned.

Development

Concept and creation
Rayla's early designs pictured her as too confident and had to be adjusted. Her early expression sheets also served as a practice for Wonderstorm's artists to figure out the four fingers of elven hands. In early concepts, Rayla had an additional marking on her forehead. It was Giancarlo Volpe's idea to put in Rayla's "Naruto-run" with encouragement from Lulu Younes.

Characterization and progression
Rayla is described as courageous and sharp-witted. Despite being raised to be an assassin and possessing all the skills required for the profession, Rayla is very moral and compassionate, and thus lacks the ruthlessness needed to take a life, especially the life of one who hasn't wronged her personally.

Rayla initially has a rather black-and-white perspective on the conflict between humans and magical creatures, but she later comes to view it in a more complex light.

Rayla suffers from aquaphobia; she is terrified of water and often gets seasick when she's on a boat.

Powers and abilities
In the world of The Dragon Prince, only magical creatures can use magic because they have magical energy within them. All magic originates from one of six Primal Sources; the Sun, the Moon, the Stars, the Earth, the Sky, and the Ocean. As a Moonshadow elf, Rayla is naturally connected to the moon, and while she has never been seen performing any spells, she can use her primal connection to assume her "Moonshadow form" during a full moon. In this form, she is nearly invisible. The novelization of season one reveals that Rayla rather ironically dislikes using this ability, as she finds it disorientating.

Rayla is a master sword-fighter, especially with dual-blades, and is believed to be the fastest and strongest of her fellow assassins despite her young age. Rayla's weapon(s) of choice are a pair of twin blades that reflect her fighting style. These weapons were forged by her foster guardian Ethari, and are capable of switching between lethal blades and curved hooks even in mid-air, allowing her to catch an enemy off-guard. They are based on real-life balisongs or butterfly knives in their way to function.

Reception
Rayla has been generally praised by critics and fans. Swara Ahmed considered her the "best written" and most "compelling" of the three main protagonists, complimenting her internal conflict and determination to "get justice in her own way." He believed audiences would form a connection to Rayla as soon as they saw her eyes. Ahmed considered her story "amazing" and found her journey with Callum and Ezran "entertaining."

However, Rayla has been criticized by some people, and Paula Burrows' performance of the character has been generally mixed. Gavia Baker-Whitelaw of The Daily Dot criticized Rayla's Scottish accent as "the worst part of the show." Some people did like her accent; others criticized it for being "inconsistent" or regarded it as "terrible".

References

Female characters in animation
Television characters introduced in 2018
Fantasy television characters
Fictional characters who use magic
Fictional female assassins
Fictional women soldiers and warriors
Fictional child soldiers
Fictional swordfighters
Fictional characters who can move at superhuman speeds
Fictional bodyguards
Fictional exiles